Jaidi or Jaïdi may refer to
Jaidi, Nepal, a village in central Nepal
Baglung Jaidi, a development committee of Baglung District in western Nepal
Athar Shah Khan Jaidi, Pakistani comedian, poet and writer
Aziz Jaidi (born 1967), Moroccan police officer
Radhi Jaïdi (born 1975), Tunisian football player